Methylocella palustris is a species of bacterium. It is notable for oxidising methane. It is acidophilic and was first found in a peat bogs, representing a novel subtype of serine-pathway methanotrophs, for which a new genus was described. It is aerobic, Gram-negative, colourless, non-motile and its cells can be straight or curved rods. Strain KT (= ATCC 700799T) is the type strain.

References

Further reading

External links

LPSN

Beijerinckiaceae
Bacteria described in 2000